The Hunter 33.5 is an American sailboat that was designed for cruising and first built in 1987.

The Hunter 33.5 design was developed into the Moorings 335 in 1988, as a charter version for Moorings Yacht Charter.

Production
The design was built by Hunter Marine in the United States, but it is now out of production.

Design
The Hunter 33.5 is a recreational keelboat, built predominantly of fiberglass, with wood trim. It has a fractional sloop B&R rig, a raked stem, a walk-through reverse transom, an internally-mounted spade-type rudder controlled by a wheel and a fixed fin keel. It displaces  and carries  of ballast.

It was also available with a bulb wing keel, an elliptical wing keel or a Collins tandem keel.

The boat is fitted with a diesel engine.

The design has a PHRF racing average handicap of 147 with a high of 156 and low of 141.

Operational history
Yacht designer Robert Perry wrote a review of the design in 2000 for Sailing magazine. He described the boat as, "The sailplan shows this to be a handsome design with, by today's standards, moderate freeboard, short ends and a clean wedge-shaped house. Initially, I was struck by the tall fractional rig." He concluded, "The basic hull shape is pretty conservative. The stern is broad to help with sailing length, cockpit size and accommodations aft, although not necessarily in that order. I like the short bow overhang."

See also
List of sailing boat types

Related development
Hunter 333
Moorings 335

Similar sailboats
Abbott 33
Arco 33
C&C 3/4 Ton
C&C 33
C&C 101
C&C SR 33
Cape Dory 33
Cape Dory 330
CS 33
Endeavour 33
Hans Christian 33
Hunter 33
Hunter 33-2004
Hunter 336
Hunter 340
Marlow-Hunter 33
Mirage 33
Nonsuch 33
Tanzer 10
Viking 33
Watkins 33

References

Keelboats
1980s sailboat type designs
Sailing yachts
Sailboat types built by Hunter Marine